This is a list of cases reported in volume 3 U.S. (3 Dall.) of United States Reports, decided by the Supreme Court of the United States from 1794 to 1799. Case reports from other tribunals also appear in 3 U.S. (3 Dall.).

Alexander Dallas and Dallas Reports 
Not all of the cases reported in 3 U.S. (3 Dall.) are from the United States Supreme Court. Included are decisions from the Supreme Court of Pennsylvania, and the United States Circuit Court for the District of Pennsylvania. 
Alexander J. Dallas, a Philadelphia lawyer and later United States Secretary of the Treasury, had been in the business of reporting local law cases for newspapers and periodicals. When the US Supreme Court sat in Philadelphia from 1791–1800, he collected their cases as well, and later began compiling his case reports in a bound volume which he called Reports of cases ruled and adjudged in the courts of Pennsylvania, before and since the Revolution.

When the US Supreme Court along with the rest of the new federal government moved in 1791 from the former capital, New York City, to the nation's temporary capital in Philadelphia, Dallas was appointed the Supreme Court's first unofficial and unpaid Supreme Court Reporter. (Court reporters in that age received no salary, but were expected to profit from the publication and sale of their compiled decisions.) Dallas continued to collect and publish Pennsylvania and other decisions, adding federal Supreme Court cases to his reports. Dallas published four volumes of decisions during his tenure as Reporter, known as the Dallas Reports.

The Supreme Court moved to the new capital city of Washington D.C. in 1800. Dallas remained in Philadelphia; William Cranch then replaced him as Reporter of Decisions of the Supreme Court of the United States.

Nominative Reports 
In 1874, the U.S. government created the United States Reports, and retroactively numbered older privately-published case reports as part of the new series. As a result, cases appearing in volumes 1–90 of U.S. Reports have dual citation forms; one for the volume number of U.S. Reports, and one for the volume number of the reports named for the relevant reporter of decisions (these are called "nominative reports"). As such, volumes 1–4 of United States Reports correspond to volumes 1–4 of Dallas Reports. The dual citation form of, for example, Hunter v. Fairfax's Devisee is 3 U.S. (3 Dall.) 305 (1796).

Courts in 3 U.S. (3 Dall.) 
The cases reported in 3 U.S. (3 Dall.) come from the Supreme Court of the United States, the Supreme Court of Pennsylvania (Pa.), and the United States Circuit Court for the District of Pennsylvania (C.C.D. Pa.).

Justices of the Supreme Court at the time of 3 U.S. (3 Dall.) 

The Supreme Court is established by Article III, Section 1 of the Constitution of the United States, which says: "The judicial Power of the United States, shall be vested in one supreme Court . . .". The size of the Court is not specified; the Constitution leaves it to Congress to set the number of justices. Under the Judiciary Act of 1789 Congress originally fixed the number of justices at six (one chief justice and five associate justices). Since 1789 Congress has varied the size of the Court from six to seven, nine, ten, and back to nine justices (always including one chief justice).

When the cases in 3 U.S. (3 Dall.) were decided, the Court comprised six of the following eleven justices at one time:

Notable Cases in 3 U.S. (3 Dall.)

Calder v. Bull 
In Calder v. Bull, 3 U.S. (3 Dall.) 386 (1798), the Supreme Court decided four important points of constitutional law:
First, the ex post facto clause of the United States Constitution applies to criminal laws that have at least one of four effects: (a) creates a crime and penalty that before passage of the law which was not illegal; (b) makes an existing crime of greater severity than it was when committed; (c) inflicts a greater punishment to an existing crime than applied before the law; (d) changes rules of evidence to make less, or different, evidence than the law required at the time of the crime to convict the offender.
Second, the Court lacked authority to nullify state laws that may violate that state's own constitution.
Third, no one should be compelled to do what the laws do not require; nor to refrain from acts which the laws permit.
Fourth, a state legislative act does not violate of the ex post facto clause if there is nothing done by the parties that is affected by the state law.

Georgia v. Brailsford 
In Georgia v. Brailsford, 3 U.S. (3 Dall.) 1 (1794), is significant as the only reported jury trial held by the US Supreme Court. During the American Revolution, the state of Georgia passed a law that sequestered debts owed to British creditors. The Treaty of Paris, however, asserted the validity of debts held by creditors on both sides. The case was filed directly in the United States Supreme Court, rather than in a lower trial court, under the Supreme Court's constitutionally-defined original jurisdiction.

Hollingsworth v. Virginia 
In Hollingsworth v. Virginia, 3 U.S. (3 Dall.) 378 (1798) the Court held the President of the United States has no formal role in the process of amending the United States Constitution, and that the Eleventh Amendment was binding on cases already pending before its ratification.

Citation style 

Under the Judiciary Act of 1789 the federal court structure at the time comprised District Courts, which had general trial jurisdiction; Circuit Courts, which had mixed trial and appellate (from the US District Courts) jurisdiction; and the United States Supreme Court, which had appellate jurisdiction over the federal District and Circuit courts—and for certain issues over state courts. The Supreme Court also had limited original jurisdiction (i.e., in which cases could be filed directly with the Supreme Court without first having been heard by a lower federal or state court). There were one or more federal District Courts and/or Circuit Courts in each state, territory, or other geographical region.

Bluebook citation style is used for case names, citations, and jurisdictions. 
 e.g.,"C.C.D.N.J." = United States Circuit Court for the District of New Jersey
 e.g.,"D. Mass." = United States District Court for the District of Massachusetts 
 "E." = Eastern; "M." = Middle; "N." = Northern; "S." = Southern; "W." = Western
 e.g.,"C.C.S.D.N.Y." = United States Circuit Court for the Southern District of New York
 e.g.,"M.D. Ala." = United States District Court for the Middle District of Alabama
 "Ct. Cl." = United States Court of Claims
 The abbreviation of a state's name alone indicates the highest appellate court in that state's judiciary at the time. 
 e.g.,"Pa." = Supreme Court of Pennsylvania
 e.g.,"Me." = Supreme Judicial Court of Maine

List of cases in 3 U.S. (3 Dall.)

Cases of the Supreme Court of the United States

Cases of other tribunals

Notes and References

See also
 Certificate of division

External links
  Case reports in volume 3 (3 Dall.) from Court Listener
  Case reports in volume 3 (3 Dall.) from the Caselaw Access Project of Harvard Law School
  Case reports in volume 3 (3 Dall.) from Justia
  Case reports in volume 3 (3 Dall.) from Open Jurist
 Website of the United States Supreme Court
 United States Courts website about the Supreme Court
 National Archives, Records of the Supreme Court of the United States
 American Bar Association, How Does the Supreme Court Work?
 The Supreme Court Historical Society

1794 in United States case law
1795 in United States case law
1796 in United States case law
1797 in United States case law
1798 in United States case law
1799 in United States case law